Eric Carlsén, Eric Carlson, Eric Carlsson or Erik Karlsson may refer to:

 Eric Carlsén (born 1982), Swedish curler
 Erik Carlsen (1911–1999), Danish equestrian

 Eric Carlson (musician) (born 1958), American heavy metal guitarist
 Eric Carlson (architect) (born 1963), American architect

 Erik Carlsson (1929–2015), Swedish rally driver
 Erik Carlsson (weightlifter) (1893–1981), Swedish weightlifter

 Eric Karlsson (footballer), member of the Swedish national football team in 1946; see 1946–47 in Swedish football

 Erik Karlsson (born 1990), Swedish professional ice hockey defenceman playing in the NHL
 Erik Karlsson (ice hockey, born 1994), Swedish professional ice hockey forward

See also
 Erik Carlsson Sjöblad (1647–1725), Swedish governor, admiral, and baron
 Eric Carlson Three-Decker, an historic house in Worcester, Massachusetts, USA